Shellbrook Airport  is located  east of Shellbrook, Saskatchewan, Canada.

See also 
 List of airports in Saskatchewan

References 

Registered aerodromes in Saskatchewan
Shellbrook No. 493, Saskatchewan